The Nainital Bank Limited (NTB) (known as Nainital Bank) (Kumaoni: नैनताल बैंक) is a scheduled commercial bank founded in 1922. The bank is a wholly owned subsidiary of Bank of Baroda which is under the ownership of Ministry of Finance of the Government of India. The bank has expanded to Uttar Pradesh and Uttarakhand, and has only 166 branches in Rajasthan, Delhi and Haryana. It has become TTC (Ten Thousand Crore) Company and aims to be most customer centric bank of India, it is listed as a scheduled bank by the Reserve Bank of India.

Overview
Nainital Bank was founded by Govind Ballabh Pant. In 1992, the government-owned Bank of Baroda (BOB), the second largest bank in India, acquired a 98.6% (around 99%) stake in the bank and made it a subsidiary.

In April 2004, National Insurance Company (NIC) signed an agreement with Nainital Bank for distribution of its general insurance products through the bank's branches across Uttarakhand, Haryana and New Delhi states. The bank had a net worth of around Rs 1.12 billion on as on 31 March 2006. It bank launched its rights issue in September 2009, to expand its capital adequacy ratio (CAR) to 14 per cent, this came after it previously withdrew its plans for an IPO due to adverse market conditions in 2007; by April 2010, the right issue had raised .

Nainital bank is associated with Bank of Baroda, HDFC Bank, LIC, National Insurance Company Limited etc.
Currently, NBL has 166 branches in Uttarakhand, Uttar Pradesh, Delhi, Haryana and Rajasthan. It also provide online facilities, apart from Personal Banking, Business Banking, Rural and Agricultural Banking. The Nainital Bank Limited is registered as scheduled commercial bank with Reserve Bank of India (RBI), the central bank of India.

Branch Locations
The Nainital Bank Limited has 166 branches presently in the following Indian states.
Uttarakhand
Uttar Pradesh
Delhi
Rajasthan
Haryana

See also

 Banking in India
 List of banks in India
 Reserve Bank of India
 Indian Financial System Code
 List of largest banks
 List of companies of India
 Make in India

References

External links

Bank of Baroda
Nainital
Banks established in 1922
Organisations based in Uttarakhand
Economy of Uttarakhand
Private sector banks in India
Indian companies established in 1922